The 2009 World Junior Ice Hockey Championship Division I was two international ice hockey tournaments, the second level of the 2009 World Junior Ice Hockey Championships. The winners of each group were promoted to the Top Division for the 2010 IIHF World U20 Championship, while the last place teams in each group were relegated to Division II for the 2010 IIHF World U20 Championship.

Group A
The Group A tournament was played from 14 to 20 December 2008 in Herisau, Switzerland.

Final standings

Results
All times are local.

Group B
The Group B tournament was played from 15 to 21 December 2008 in Aalborg, Denmark.

Final standings

Results

See also
 2009 World Junior Ice Hockey Championships
 2009 World Junior Ice Hockey Championships – Division I
 2009 World Junior Ice Hockey Championships – Division II
 2009 World Junior Ice Hockey Championships – Division III

References

I
World Junior Ice Hockey Championships – Division I
World
International ice hockey competitions hosted by Switzerland
International ice hockey competitions hosted by Denmark